Vərməziyar (also, Varmaziyar) is a village and municipality in the Sharur District of Nakhchivan, Azerbaijan. It is located 9 km away from the district center, on the plain. Its population is mainly busy with farming. There are secondary school, library, club and a medical center in the village. It has a population of 1,269.

Etymology
The name of the Vərməziyar village made out from the components of the Old Azeri (an Iranian language) word of var (castle, village)  and Məzyar (person's name) means "the village which belongs to Məzyar".

References 

Populated places in Sharur District